Oktyabrsky was a rural locality (an inhabited locality) in the administrative jurisdiction of Kirovsk Town with Jurisdictional Territory in Murmansk Oblast, Russia, located on the Kola Peninsula beyond the Arctic Circle at a height of  above sea level. Population: 41 (2010 Census). Due to depopulation, it was abolished effective April 26, 2013.

References

Notes

Sources

Abolished inhabited localities in Murmansk Oblast